Bezmer (Bulgarian: Безмер) may refer to:

 Bezmer, Dobrich Province, a village in Tervel municipality
 Bezmer, Yambol Province, a village in Tundzha municipality
 Bezmer Point, a promontory on the northwest coast of the Varna Peninsula, Livingston Island, in the South Shetland Islands, Antarctica
 Batbayan of Bulgaria, also known as Bezmer, a tsar (khan) of Bulgaria (668-671)